Surfers Paradise North light rail station is situated on the corner of Ocean Avenue and Surfers Paradise Boulevard in the Gold Coast suburb of Surfers Paradise. The station is part of the Gold Coast's G:link light rail system and serves the northern part of Surfers Paradise. Surfers Paradise North light rail station opened in July 2014 with the commencement of stage 1 of the G:link system.

Location 
Below is a map of the local area. The station can be identified by the grey marker.{
  "type": "FeatureCollection",
  "features": [
    {
      "type": "Feature",
      "properties": {},
      "geometry": {
        "type": "Point",
        "coordinates": [
          153.4292173397262,
          -27.992317878921774
        ]
      }
    }
  ]
}

References

External links 

 G:link

G:link stations
Railway stations in Australia opened in 2014
Surfers Paradise, Queensland